Rawson is a surname. Notable people and characters with the surname include:

A 

Albert Rawson (1900–1949), English footballer
Amán Rawson (1792–1847), American physician and merchant
Anna Rawson (born 1981), Australian professional golfer and model
Arturo Rawson (1885–1952), Argentine army officer and de facto president

C 
Charles A. Rawson (1867–1936), unelected United States Senator from Iowa for nine months in 1922
Christopher Rawson (born Christopher Comstock Hart, birthdate unknown), American writer, university teacher and theater critic
Clayton Rawson (1906–1971), American mystery writer, editor, and amateur magician
Sir Alfred Cooper Rawson (1876–1946), British businessman and Conservative Party MP

D 
Don Rawson (born 1937), former Australian rules footballer who played with Footscray in the Victorian Football League
Donald Strathearn Rawson (1905–1961), Canadian limnologist

E 
Edward Rawson (disambiguation), several people
Elizabeth Rawson (1934–1988), classical scholar known primarily for her work in the intellectual history of the Roman Republic and her biography of Cicero
Elvira Rawson de Dellepiane (née Elvira Rawson; 1867–1954), militant suffragist and the second woman to receive a medical degree in Argentina

F 
Farrend Rawson (born 1996), footballer who plays as a central defender for Derby County
Franklin Rawson (1819 or 1820 – 1871), Argentine painter who belonged to the first generation of Argentine painters called the "precursors"

G 
Major-General Geoffrey Rawson (1887–1979), British Army officer who served in both the First and Second World Wars and had a notable cricket career, playing first-class cricket for the Army in 1921
George Rawson (1807–1889), English lawyer, hymnwriter and Congregationalist lay person
Guillermo Rawson, 19th century Argentine politician

H 
Admiral Sir Harry Holdsworth Rawson (1843–1910), oversaw the British Benin Expedition of 1897
Herbert Rawson (1852–1924), English footballer

J 
James Rawson (born 1965), British Paralympic table tennis player
Dame Jessica Rawson (born 1943), English art historian, curator and academic administrator
John Rawson, 1st Viscount Clontarf (c. 1470–1547), English-born statesman in Ireland

M 
Marion Nicholl Rawson (1878–1956), author, illustrator, artist and lecturer
Mary Rawson, American actress
Mary Anne Rawson (1801–1887), abolitionist
Mike Rawson (1934–2000) British Olympic track and field athlete

N 
Norman Rawson, Canadian politician

P 
Peter Rawson (born 1957), Zimbabwean cricketer

R 
Ray Rawson (born 1940), American politician who was a Republican member of the Nevada State Senate
Rawson W. Rawson (1812–1899), British government official and statistician
Rebecca Rawson (1656–1692), heroine of the 1849 book Leaves from Margaret Smith's Journal, in the Province of Massachusetts Bay by John G. Whittier
Richard Rawson (disambiguation), several people
Roger Rawson (1939–2009), American teacher and politician from Utah
Ronald Rawson, British heavyweight boxer of the 1920s
Roy Rawson (1898–1971), Australian politician

S 
Stratton Rawson, independent film producer, screenwriter and music critic

W 
Wilhelmina Rawson (1851–1933), Australian author and authority on culinary and domestic practices
William Rawson (1854–1932), amateur footballer who played for England
William H. Rawson (1892–1957), American Republican Party politician from New Jersey

Z 
Z. B. Rawson (1858–1928), American politician in the state of Washington